List of works by or about David Remnick, American writer and editor of The New Yorker.

Books

Essays and reporting 
 
 
  Republican Party Presidential candidates.
  Post-election challenges for President Obama.
 
  Reviews .
 
 
  Boston Marathon bombing.
  WNYC-FM host Jonathan Schwartz.

Notes 

Bibliographies by writer
Bibliographies of American writers